BOB MUSIC is the fourth original album by Taiwanese-American singer-songwriter Joanna Wang, a collaboration with Korean producing duo Coach & Sendo.

The album has been described as both a "rock children's TV show soundtrack", and an album from the perspective of a high school girl. Receiving praise for its unique combination of mundane subject matter with upbeat tunes.

Track listing

References

2015 albums
Joanna Wang albums
Pop rock albums by Taiwanese artists